NGC 297 is an elliptical galaxy in the constellation Cetus. It was discovered on September 27, 1864 by Albert Marth.

References

External links 
 

0297
Elliptical galaxies
18640927
Cetus (constellation)